Mnet (acronym of Music Network) is a South Korean pay television music channel owned by CJ E&M, a division of CJ ENM, part of CJ Group.

The CJ E&M Center Studio located in Sangam-dong, Mapo-gu, Seoul is the headquarters, broadcast and recording centre of many Mnet programs with a studio audience, namely the live weekly music show M Countdown. It is also the venue for live performances in survival shows such as Superstar K, Show Me The Money series, Produce 101 series, Comeback War series, Planet series and Street Dance series. Other shows are filmed in CJ E&M Studio in Ilsan and CJ E&M Contents World in Paju.

History 
The global website named for Mnet Global changed to MWave in April 2013. Other sites from Mnet are not affected with the change.

On February 5, 2020, it was revealed that CJ ENM had begun restructuring Mnet's "We Are K-Pop" slogan and brand after the controversy behind "Produce 101" damaged the network's image.

On February 24, 2020, Mnet unveiled their new brand logo along with its 25th anniversary., Their new logo design is based on their old logo from 1995 with the addition of their current Mnet shape and colour. M2, Mwave, and the Mnet Production logo have stuck to the former design.

On May 21, 2020, Mnet reverted its logo back to its former design with Social distancing animations.

Slogans

Mnet Digital Studio 
Mnet Digital Studio launched STUDIO CHOOM in May 2019, a YouTube channel which features notable Kpop acts performing dances in front of the studio's white background and colored lights. The sets often feature backup dancers and usually lack any background props.

Programming

Current programming

Variety shows 
 Boys Planet
Born To Choom Part2
 HIT village

Music programming 
 M Countdown
 Daily Music Talk
 M Evening
 Live on M
 MUSICEXPRESS
 MUSIC X CURATION
 MPD MUSIC TALK
 MPD Music Video Commentary
 M2 Today's Song Weekly Chart
 Mnet Present
 M Super Concert

Awards Ceremony 
 MAMA Awards (1999–present)

Special events
 Billboard Music Award (2018–present)
 Gaon Chart Music Awards (2017–present)
 Grammy Award (2018–present)

Upcoming programming 
I Can See Your Voice 10 (March 22, 2023)
Girls Night Out (March 27, 2023)
Kep1er Unner (co-produced by Swing Entertainment and Wake One Entertainment) (March 28, 2023)
Mnet Prime Show (March 29, 2023)
 Queendom Puzzle (May 2023)
 I-LAND 2 (2023) (co-produced by Belift Lab)
 Street Woman Fighter 2 (2023)

Former programming

Awards Ceremony 
 Mnet 20's Choice Awards (2007–2013)
 M2 X Genie Music Awards (2019)

Special events
 Asia Song Festival (2016–2018)
 American Music Award (2017)
 idolCON (2017, 2018)
 Style Icon Asia (2008–2014, 2016)

Dramas 
 Monstar (2013)
 Mimi (2014)
 Entertain Us (2014)
 Sing Again, Hera Gu (2015)
 The Lover (2015)

Variety shows and specials 

 M terview
 Be Stupid
 Dirty Talk
 Fun & Joy
 Love & Hate
 MLive
 Mnet Special
 Mnet Star
 M WIDE ENEWS
 Music Spotlight
 Spring, Summer, Fall, Winter Forest
 Boys & Girls Music Countdown (2007–2010)
 Girls' Generation Goes to School (2007)
 Girls' Generation's Factory Girl (2008)
 Wonder Bakery (2008)
 Kara Bakery (2009)
 BIGBANG TV (2009)
 2NE1 TV (2009–2011) 
 Nicole The Entertainer's Introduction to Veterinary Science (2009–2010)
 Superstar K  (co-produced by Signal Entertainment Group; simulcast on tvN) (2009–2016)
 Beatles Code (2010, 2013)
 M! Pick (2011)
 Real Homme (2011)
 K-Pop Star Hunt (2011–2014)
 MyDOL (2012)  (co-produced by Jellyfish Entertainment)
 Boyfriend's W Academy (2012)
 The God of music (2012, 2016)
 JJANG! (2012–2013)
 The Voice of Korea (simulcast on tvN) (2012–2013, 2020)
 M Countdown Begins (Formerly RT M Countdown) (2012–2015)
 M-GIGS (2012–2016)
 Show Me the Money (2012-2022)
 BLACK CAST (2013)
 The Voice Kids (2013)
 Signal B (2013)
 Image Fighter 2013 (2013)
 Superhit (2013)
 Enemy of Broadcasting (2013)
 WINNER TV (2013)
 YG's Win: Who Is Next (2013) (co-produced by YG Entertainment) 
 Dancing 9 (2013–2014)
 Rain Effect (2013–2014)
 tune up with Mnet (2013–2014)
 Idol Battle (2014)
 Beatles Code 3D (2014)
 American Hustle Life (2014)
 Moon Hee-joon's Pure 15 (2014)
 Mix & Match (2014) (co-produced by YG Entertainment)
 Block B's Live! 5 Minutes Before Chaos (2014)
 Exo 90:2014 (2014)
 XOXO Exo (2014)
 Superstar K 6 all-star concert (2014)
 This Is Infinite (2014)
 Trot X (2014)
 Foul Interview 4 Things Show (2014–2015)
 The Singer Game (2014)
 100 Seconds War (2014)
 Idol Make-up Recipe (2014)
 Kim Bum Soo Comeback Show (2014)
 No.Mercy (2014–2015)
 MAMA Hidden Story (2014)
 Super Idol Chart Show (2014–2015)
 Superstar K6 B-SIDE (2014–2015)
 Hologram (2015)
 Heart a Tag (2015)
 Headliner (2015)
 Monthly Live Connection (2015)
 One Night Study (2015) (co-produced by FNC Entertainment)
 Sixteen (2015)  (co-produced by JYP Entertainment and Koen Media)
 Ya-man TV (2015)
 Key's Know How (co-produced by SM Entertainment) (2015)
 Superstar K BEFORE & AFTER (2015)
 Unpretty Rapstar  (2015–2016)
 Produce 101 (2016–2017)
 Boys24 (2016) (co-produced by Live Works Company and N2 Studios, simulcast on tvN)
 d.o.b : Dance or Band (2016) (co-produced by FNC Entertainment)
 Finding Momo Land (co-produced by Duble Kick Entertainment and twin7 Entertainment)
 I.O.I Comeback Countdown (2016)
 Lady bees (2016) (co-produced by Zhejiang TV, For Zhejiang TV)
 LAN Cable Friends I.O.I (2016)
 MIXTAPE (2016)
 Monsta X's Right Now! (2016)
 Me&7Men (co-produced by Plan A Entertainment and CK1 Media) (2016)
 PAN STEALER (2016)
 Pentagon Maker (2016) (co-produced by Cube Entertainment)
 Really Really Really Miss You Show (2016)
 Sing Street (2016)
 Standby I.O.I (2016)
 Twice's Private Life (2016)
 We Kid (simulcast on tvN) (2016)
 Would You Like Girls: My Cosmic Diary (2016) (co-produced by Starship Entertainment and Urban Works Media)
 Hit the Stage (simulcast on tvN) (2016)
 New YANG NAM SHOW (rename form YANG and NAM SHOW) (2016–2017)
 Golden Tambourine (2016–2017)
 High School Rapper (2017–2021)
 Wiki BOYS24 (co-produced by Live Works Company and N2 Studios) (2017)
 BOYS24 SEMI FINAL (co-produced by Live Works Company and N2 Studios) (2017)
 A-IF-Ril (co-produced by DSP Media) (2017)
 Dodaeng's Diary in LA (co-produced by Fantagio) (2017)
 Woollim Pick 2017 (co-produced by Woollim Entertainment) (2017)
 Wanna One Premier Show Con (2017)
 SNOWBALL PROJECT (co-produced by S.M. Entertainment and Mystic Entertainment) (2017)
 Comeback Show – BTS DNA (co-produced by Big Hit Entertainment) (2017)
 BTS Countdown (co-produced by Big Hit Entertainment) (2017)
 Idol School (co-produced Take One Studio) (2017)
 My Love My Friend (2017)
 JustBeJoyful JBJ (co-produced by LOEN Entertainment) (2017)
 Project S : Devil's Talent Donation (2017)
 fromis_'s room (2017)
 Stray Kids (co-produced by JYP Entertainment) (2017)
 Wanna One Go (co-produced by YMC Entertainment) (2017)
 Wanna One Nothing Without You Comeback (co-produced by YMC Entertainment) (2017)
 Wanna One Go Zero Base (co-produced by YMC Entertainment) (2017)
 The Master (2017–2018)
 Wanna One Comeback "I Promise You" (co-produced by YMC Entertainment) (2018)
 Heize COMEBACK SHOW (2018)
 idolity (2018)
 COMEBACK SOLID Into the Light (2018)
 BTS Comeback Show – Highlight Reel (co-produced by Big Hit Entertainment)
 BREAKERS (2018)
 Finding Hero: Geek Tour (2018)
 SVT Club (co-produced by Pledis Entertainment) (2018)
 Wanna One Go X-CON! (co-produced by Swing Entertainment) (2018)
 The Call (2018–2019)
 SHINee's BACK (co-produced by SM Entertainment) (2018)
 Produce 48 (co-produced by AKS) (2018)
 LIVE QUIZ ON (2018)
 RunBTS (co-produced by Big Hit Entertainment) (2018)
 Code Name is ATEEZ  (co-produced by KQ Entertainment) (2018)
 Got7 Comeback Show – Present: YOU (co-produced by JYP Entertainment) (2018)
 A Battle of One Voice: 300 (Rerun from tvN) (2018)
 GOT YA! GWSN (co-produced by Kiwi Media Group) (2018)
 Bultoen Honkono (불토엔 혼코노) (2018)
 IZ*ONE 'COLOR*IZ' SHOW–CON (co-produced by Off the Record Entertainment) (2018)
 Tutor (2018)
 Got7's Hard Carry 2 (co-produced by JYP Entertainment) (2018)
 The Kkondae Live (2018)
 NOW VERIVERY (co-produced by Jellyfish Entertainment) (2018)
 NU'EST Road (co-produced by Pledis Entertainment) (2018)
 Wanna One Comeback Show "Power of Destiny (co-produced by Swing Entertainment) (2018)
 Somebody (2018–2019)
 Love Catcher (2018–2019, 2021-2022)
 ATEEZ: TREASURE FILM (co-produced by KQ Entertainment) (2019)
 Premier Showcase VERIVERY (co-produced by Jellyfish Entertainment) (2019)
 TOMORROW X TOGETHER DEBUT CELEBRATION SHOW (co-produced by Big Hit Entertainment) (2019)
 SUPER INTERN (co-produced by JYP Entertainment) (2019)
 UHSN (2019)
 Produce X 101 (2019)
 ONE DREAM.TXT (co-produced by Big Hit Entertainment) (2019)
 FLEX ZONE (2019)
 X1 PREMIER SHOW-CON (co-produced by Swing Entertainment) (2019)
 X1 FLASH (2019)
 Premier Show Con Pentagon (co-produced by Cube Entertainment) (2019)
 IZ*ONE Style Vlog in LA (co-produced by Off The Record Entertainment) (2019)
 Not the Same Person You Used to Know (2019)
 OnlyOneOf: Unlocking Love (co-produced by 8D Creative) (2019)
 Got7's Hard Carry 2.5 (co-produced by JYP Entertainment) (2019)
 EVERGLOW LAND (co-produced by Yuehua Entertainment) (2019)
 naturereality (co-produced by n.CH Music Entertainment) (2019)
 World Klass (co-produced by Stone Music Entertainment) (2019)
 Queendom (2019, 2022)
 TMI Show (2019-2022)
 Paris et ITZY (co-produced by JYP Entertainment) (2020)
 COMEBACK IZ*ONE BLOOM*IZ (co-produced by Off The Record Entertainment) (2020)
 Kang Daniel Comeback Show CYAN (co-produced by Konnect Entertainment) (2020)
 TOO DEBUT SHOW TOO DAY (co-produced by Stone Music Entertainment)(2020)
 Wanna Be Singers (2020)
 Do You Know Hiphop?  (2020)
 Gang Student (GANG생) (2020)
 NU'EST Come Back Show : The Nocturne (co-produced by Pledis Entertainment) (2020)
 TOMORROW X TOGETHER Comeback Show (co-produced by Big Hit Entertainment) (2020)
 Song FARM! (곡FARM!) (2020)
 Taeyeon Beauty-Log (2020)
 Studio Music Hall (스튜디오 음악당) (2020)
 Quiz Music Show (2020)
 IZ*ONE COMEBACK SHOW ONEIRIC DIARY (co-produced by Swing Entertainment) (2020)
 Road to Kingdom (2020)
 SEVENTEEN COMEBACK SHOW: [Heng:garae] (co-produced by Pledis Entertainment) (2020)
 AB6IX COMEBACK SHOW VIVID (co-produced by Brand New Music) (2020)
 TOO MYSTERY (co-produced by Stone Music Entertainment)(2020)
 Finding Stray Kids (co-produced by JYP Entertainment) (2020)
 GOOD GIRL (2020)
 I-LAND (co-produced by Belift Lab) (2020)
 BTS Special: Dynamite (co-produced by Big Hit Entertainment) (2020)
 IZ*ONE CHU ON:TACT (co-produced by Swing Entertainment) (2020)
GHOST9 DEBUT SHOWCASE [DOOR] (co-produced by Maroo Entertainment) (2020)
 TOMORROW X TOGETHER Comeback Show: Blue Hour (co-produced by Big Hit Entertainment) (2020)
 MAMAMOO COMEBACK SHOW <MONOLOGUE> (co-produced by RBW) (2020)
 ENHYPEN DEBUT SHOW : DAY ONE  (co-produced by Belift Lab) (2020)
 NCT World 2.0 (co-produced by SM Entertainment)
 IZ*ONE One-reeler Premier (co-produced by Swing Entertainment) (2020)
 GHOST9 COMEBACK SHOWCASE [W.ALL] In Busan (co-produced by Maroo Entertainment) (2020)
 VICTON COMEBACK SHOW (2020)
 ITZY In Korea (2020)
 BooKae Contest (2020)
 Running Girls (2020)
 CAP-TEEN (2020–2021)
 Folk Us (2020–2021)
 One More Time (2021)
 Full Sound (배부른 소리) (2021)
 Salary Lupin ATEEZ (2021)
 SUPER JUNIOR COMEBACK SHOW : House Party (co-produced by SM Entertainment) (2021)
 ENHYPEN&Hi S2 (co-produced by Belift Lab) (2021)
 ENHYPEN COMEBACK SHOW 'CARNIVAL''' (co-produced by Belift Lab) (2021)
 Kingdom: Legendary War (2021)
 Welcome 2 House: TO1 X EPEX (co-produced by Stone Music Entertainment and C9 Entertainment) (2021)
 The CIX Million Dollar Kids (co-produced by C9 Entertainment) (2021)
 2PM WILDSIX (co-produced by JYP Entertainment) (2021)
 Kingdom Week : <NO+> (2021)
 ENHYPEN COMEBACK SHOW 'DILEMMA' (co-produced by Belift Lab) (2021)
 E'last Superhero (2021)
 Girls Planet 999 (co-produced by NCSoft) (2021)
 Street Woman Fighter (2021)
 The Playlist (2021)
 MAMA : The Original KPOP Awards (2021)
 Kep1er View (co-produced by Swing Entertainment and Wake One Entertainment) (2021)
 Kep1er Debut Show (co-produced by Swing Entertainment and Wake One Entertainment) (2022)
 Street Dance Girls Fighter (2021–2022)
 My K Star Family (co-produced by MBC and Discovery Channel Korea) (2021–2022)
 White Dream: DRIPPIN's Extraordinary Ski Camp (Co-produced by Woollim Entertainment) (2022)
 Back when Gen Z (Zㅏ때는 말이야) (2022)
 My Boyfriend Is Better (2022)
 ITZY Cozy House (co-produced by JYP Entertainment) (2022)
 Be Mbitious (2022)
 Anybody Can Dance (2022)
 WJSN COMEBACK SHOW: SEQUENCE (2022)
 Be the SMF (2022)
 Great Seoul Invasion (co-produced by MPMG Music) (2022)
 LE SSERAFIM Comeback Show: ANTIFRAGILE (co-produced by Source Music) (2022)
 LA@ITZY  (co-produced by JYP Entertainment) (2022)
 Finding SKZ Get edition  (co-produced by JYP Entertainment) (2022)
 Street Man Fighter (2022)
 KPOP Maker (2022)
 Artistock Game (2022)
 Mad Zenius (2022)
 LE SSERAFIM Documentary :The World Is My Oyster (co-produced Source Music) (2022)LENIVERSE (co-produced Source Music)  (2022)1,2,3 IVE (co-produced Starship Entertainment) (2022)2022 Music Makes One (2022)KEPtain Heroes (co-produced Swing Entertainment) (2022)Mbitious Man in The Crew (2022)
 The K-Star Next Door (2022)Up TO1'' (co-produced Wake One Entertainment) (2023)

Controversies

Boycotting incidents and voter fraud at MAMA

Produce 101 series & Idol School voting manipulation

Remix of Islamic call to prayer 
On August 24, 2021, Mnet's new dance survival show "Street Woman Fighter" premiered. The opening music was a remix of Adhan, the Islamic call to prayer, and many found this offensive. On September 9, the  "Street Woman Fighter" production team apologized and said they would re-upload the video with replacement music. They promised to be more careful and continue to listen to viewers' opinions in the future.

Logo

See also
 MBC M
 SBS M

References

External links
  

 
CJ E&M channels
Music television channels
Television channels in South Korea
Korean-language television stations
Television channels and stations established in 1991
1991 establishments in South Korea
Companies based in Seoul
Music organizations based in South Korea